Vilmos Tölgyesi (29 March 1931 – 12 February 1970) was a Hungarian middle-distance runner. He competed in the men's 1500 metres at the 1952 Summer Olympics.

References

External links

1931 births
1970 deaths
Athletes (track and field) at the 1952 Summer Olympics
Hungarian male middle-distance runners
Olympic athletes of Hungary
Place of birth missing
20th-century Hungarian people